Chained Heat (alternate title: Das Frauenlager in West Germany) is a 1983 American-German exploitation film in the women-in-prison genre. It was co-written and directed by Paul Nicholas (as Paul Nicolas) for Jensen Farley Pictures.  Producer was Paul Fine, who had previously produced The Concrete Jungle.

Plot
The film takes place in the California women's prison in which naive teenager Carol Henderson (Linda Blair) is sentenced to serve 18 months for accidentally killing a man. Warden Backman (John Vernon) has a hot tub in his office; his assistant, Captain Taylor (Stella Stevens) controls the prison's prostitutes and has a lover who is also involved in a clandestine affair with Ericka (Sybil Danning), the leader of the white prisoners, while the black prisoners are led by Duchess (Tamara Dobson). Lesbian rapists deal drugs. Eventually the administration pushes the prisoners too far and they drop their race-based feuding to revolt against their common enemy.

Cast
 Linda Blair as Carol
 John Vernon as Warden Backman
 Sybil Danning as Ericka
 Tamara Dobson as Duchess
 Stella Stevens as Captain Taylor
 Henry Silva as Lester
 Sharon Hughes as Val
 Robert Miano as Stone
 Greta Blackburn as Lulu
 Nita Talbot as Kaufman
 Louisa Moritz as "Bubbles"
 Monique Gabrielle as Debbie
 Edy Williams as Paula
 Carole Ita White as "Spider", credited as Carol White
 Michael Callan as Martin
 Irwin Keyes as Lorenzo
 Kate Vernon as Cellmate

Production and release
Chained Heat was produced for $950,000. It opened on May 27, 1983 in 404 theaters nationwide and made $2,252,682 in its opening weekend.  The film was in theaters for two and a half weeks in total.  , the film's domestic gross is $6,149,983.

Reception
During its release the film came under fire from critics for its sexism and from gay rights activists for negative and stereotypical portrayals of lesbians as violent and predatory. A Variety review described it as "silly, almost campy" and judged Nicholas to have "display[ed] little feel for the prison genre, emphasizing archaic sex-for-voyeurs scenes".  Chained Heats rating on Rotten Tomatoes is 56% positive reviews.

The film was nominated for two Razzie Awards including Worst Actress for Blair and won Worst Supporting Actress for Danning.

Chained Heat (Uncut and remastered edition) was released in 2011 as a DVD Women In Prison box set with Red Heat (1985) and Jungle Warriors (1984).

Sequels
In 1993 the sequel Chained Heat II, starring Brigitte Nielsen, Paul Koslo, Kimberley Kates and Kari Whitman was released.  The film was directed by Lloyd Simandl and released in Canada.  This was followed by the 1998 release of Chained Heat 3: Hell Mountain. The film starred Nicole Nieth, Kate Rodgers, and Bentley Mitchum and was directed by Mike Rhol from a screenplay by Chris Hyde.

Both sequels bear little to no relation to the first film.

References

External links

1983 films
1980s prison films
American sexploitation films
West German films
Women in prison films
American prison films
English-language German films
Golden Raspberry Award winning films
1980s English-language films
1980s American films